Fourges is a former commune in the Eure department in the Normandy region in northern France. On 1 January 2016, it was merged into the new commune of Vexin-sur-Epte.

Population

See also
 Communes of the Eure department
 Cahaignes, a close municipality in the same department

References

Former communes of Eure